Posthuma may refer to
Posthuma (surname)
Opera Posthuma, a 1677 collection of posthumous works of Baruch Spinoza
Nebria posthuma, a species of ground beetle